In New York State, Regents Examinations are statewide standardized examinations in core high school subjects. Students are required to pass these exams to earn a Regents Diploma. To graduate, students are required to have earned appropriate credits in a number of specific subjects by passing year-long or half-year courses, after which they must pass at least five Regents examinations in some of the subject areas. For higher-achieving students, a Regents with Advanced designation and an Honors designation are also offered. Students with disabilities or enrolled in an English as a Second Language program are able to earn a local diploma.

The Regents Examinations are developed and administered by the New York State Education Department (NYSED) under the authority of the Board of Regents of the University of the State of New York. Regents exams are prepared by a conference of selected New York teachers of each test's specific discipline who assemble a test map that highlights the skills and knowledge required from the specific discipline's learning standards. The conferences meet and design the tests three years before the tests' issuance, which includes time for field testing and evaluating testing questions.

History of exams
The first Regents Examinations were administered in November 1866. In 1878, the Regents Examination system was expanded to assess the curricula taught in the secondary schools of New York, and the Regents exams were first administered as high school end-of-course exams. From the original five exams (algebra, Latin, American History, natural philosophy [science], natural geography), the State Education Department expanded the Regents Exams offerings to forty-two tests in 1879; tests were administered in November, February, and June. In 1901, Regents Exams were given in rhetoric, civics, economics, Caesar, Virgil, Xenophon, and physiology.

Throughout the 1920s and into the 1930s vocational education Regents Exams were approved and administered. These included but were not limited to, agricultural science, costume draping, and salesmanship. By 1970 the number and types of Regents Exams changed to reflect the changes in high school curriculum: vocational exams were discontinued, and the sheer number of exams were either dropped or consolidated as the curricular emphasis trended toward comprehensive examinations rather than the singularly focused tests of the past.  This trend continued into the twenty-first century, with the cancellation of foreign language exams in 2010 and 2011.

In 1979, Regents Competency Tests were introduced for all students – in order to graduate students had to pass the RCT OR the Regents exam. Later, they were offered only to students with disabilities. They were discontinued after the class of 2015. In 2000, New York State Alternative Assessments (NYSAA) program was first administered allowing students with severe cognitive disabilities to complete a datafolio-style assessment to demonstrate their performance toward achieving the New York State learning standards.

The Latin, German, Greek, and Hebrew language exams were removed after the 2009–10 school year, and the remaining language exams (Italian, Spanish, and French) were removed after the 2010–11 school year. Previously, a Regents foreign language exam was an option that would allow for Regents Exam with Advanced Designation. Currently, local school districts can develop their own exams to assess foreign language competency and allow for students to meet the Advanced Designation requirement.

The June 2020, August 2020, and January 2021, then later, August 2021 and January 2022 exams were not administered as a result of the coronavirus pandemic. Only four of the ten exams were administered in June 2021.

Active exams and composition
Most Regents exams are three hours long. The exception is the Earth Science exam, which consists of a 41-minute (approximate) laboratory component usually given up to two weeks prior to the three-hour written exam.

Except for the Physics exam, which is administered only in June, the exams are given in January, June, and August.

Changes

2000s
In 2005, the Board of Regents began modifying the mathematics curriculum. An integrated approach that taught topics in geometry and algebra during each of three years, with exams like “Math A” and “Math B” normally taken after a year and a half and again after three years, was replaced by a curriculum that divides topics into Algebra I, Geometry, and Algebra II. Each of these take the form of a one-year course with a Regents Examination at the end of the year.

The format of the laboratory practical for Earth Science was changed in 2008. Currently, it consists of three sections, each with a time limit of nine minutes. While administering the test, there are multiple stations for each section. Each station uses different data, but the same task. For example, each section 1 station may have different rocks and minerals, though the task is the same.

2010s
Due to budget cuts, in June 2010 the Board of Regents voted to cancel 7th Grade regents (Algebra I, Geometry, and Living Environment) for students who were in 7th grade Honors/Accelerated Programs in Mathematics or in Science. However, this would allow the tests to still be taken early with Honors students in 8th grade. German, Latin, and Hebrew Regents foreign language exams were also cancelled, and students studying those languages are now allowed to take a locally developed examination to demonstrate competency.

On May 16, 2011, in the face of an $8 million budget gap, the Board of Regents voted to reduce the number of tests administered. The remaining foreign language exams (French, Italian, and Spanish) were eliminated, although districts may administer locally developed foreign language exams to let students attain a Regents Diploma with Advanced Designation. Tests administered during the month of January were to be canceled. In August 2011, New York City Mayor Michael Bloomberg and five private donors contributed funds to ensure that the Regents was administered in January 2012, although the foreign language exams were not reinstated.

Regent scores are invalid for students that need three or fewer points to pass and are from schools that are viewed as struggling; such students can move on to next course without a regent score.

Beginning in January 2011, the English Language Arts exam was reduced from a six-hour exam to a three-hour exam. The exam still contains essay components, but has greater emphasis on reading comprehension and less on writing.

Students graduating in 2012 (who were 9th grade students in 2008) were the first cohort of students required to take all five Regents Exams with a passing score of 65 and obtain a Regents Diploma to graduate. Previously, school districts had been permitted to offer a Local Diploma, with less stringent requirements than the Regents Diploma. Requirements have gradually been increased in recent years.

Test security procedures were heightened in response to the Stuyvesant High School cheating scandal. Effective August 2012, test proctors must collect and hold electronic devices for the duration of the exams; students are no longer permitted to have these devices on or near them. Previously, possession of electronic devices was allowed as long as they were not in use.

The Regents exams in English Language Arts and Algebra I were changed to incorporate the Common Core Standards starting in June 2014. In June 2015, the Regents Exam in Geometry was aligned with CCLS. Additionally, in June 2016, Algebra II was aligned with CCLS as well.  High school students will be allowed to continue graduating with minimum scores of 65 on state exams until 2022. At that point, required scores would rise to 75 for the English Language Arts exam and 80 in algebra—levels deemed evidence of readiness for college.

In 2015, New York began administering computer-based standardized tests.

In August 2017, the Board of Regents approved changes to the Global History and Geography exam. Instead of a comprehensive examination that covers material from two years, the new exam will cover information taught only in the 10th grade (1750–present). The new exam will also have a revised format: instead of 50 multiple choice questions, there will be only 30, but they will still be worth 55% of the grade. The thematic essay and document based question remain unchanged.

2020s
Due to the COVID-19 pandemic, the Board of Regents cancelled all Regents Examinations in the state of New York for June 2020, August 2020, and January 2021.

Also as a result of the COVID-19 pandemic, the Board of Regents voted for a plan on March 15, 2021 to make the Regents exams not required for high school diplomas in the 2020-2021 school year. They also voted to administer only four of the ten Regents examinations in June; Algebra I, Earth Science, English Language Arts, and Living Environment; as well as cancelling the August exams altogether. This still meets the federal criteria. The Board of Regents originally sent a testing waiver request to the United States Department of Education, however they indicated they are not willing to give out waivers and that schools must still meet the requirements. The US History Regents, originally scheduled for June 2022, were cancelled due to the Buffalo shooting.

Proposals
In April 2012 the Board of Regents decided to formally consider a proposal that would eliminate Regents Examination in Global History and Geography as a graduation requirement for some students beginning September 2013. Global History and Geography is the most frequently failed examination. Under the proposal, students would be able to substitute a second Regents Exam in math or science or a vocational exam for this requirement. Another proposal under consideration would keep the Global History and Geography requirement, but split the test into two separate tests, one on Global History and another on Global Geography. NYSED accepts public comment and will provide a formal proposal to the Board of Regents. That proposal had to be approved by the Board of Regents before the exam requirements can be changed. The proposal had since been denied.
There has been serious discussion in New York about the cancellation of the Regents exams. In the fall of 2019, the Board of Regents opened a commission to potentially eliminate the exams as a high school graduation requirement. Originally slated for as soon as fall 2020, the commission was placed on hold due to the COVID-19 pandemic.

Exam requirements

Students must achieve a score of 65 (55 for Special Education students) or higher on Regents Exams to pass. However this only qualifies for a local diploma as long as they compensate with a score of 65 or higher on another Regents exam. Students with disabilities still must earn a minimum score of 55 on Regents exams in English Language Arts and math. NYSED considers a score of 75 to 80 to indicate college readiness, with a score of 75 to 85 being a minimum for admission to some selective colleges and universities and a score below 75 being a threshold for placement in remediation for some schools, including SUNY and CUNY schools. In May 2022, they changed it to where  Students with failing scores of at least 50 can appeal.

Regents Diploma
In 2014, the Board of Regents created the 4+1 option, where students must pass at least 4 regents exams—one per subject—and pass one additional Regents exam in any subject.

Students must score 65 or higher in:
English Language Arts
At least one math regents (Algebra I, Algebra II, or Geometry)
At least one science regents (Chemistry, Earth Science, Living Environment, or Physics)
At least one social studies regents (Global History and Geography or United States History and Government)
One additional Regents Exam in any subject or by passing a state-approved exam

Regents Diploma with Advanced Designation

Advanced and Honors designations are available for exemplary students. In addition to the Regents exam requirements, there are additional requirements for attaining a Regents or Regents with Advanced Designation Diploma, which are described in a NYSED handout titled "General Education & Diploma Requirements", and are codified in Section 100.5 of the Part 100 Regulations of the Commissioner of Education.

Students must score 65 or higher in:
English Language Arts
All three math regents (Algebra I, Algebra II, and Geometry)
Living Environment and 1 physical science regents (Chemistry, Earth Science, or Physics)
Global History and Geography and United States History and Government

Additional honors designations
The New York State Board of Regents offers the following honors to students with exemplary academic performance:
A student who earns an average score of 90 or higher (without rounding) on required exams is eligible for a Regents Diploma with Honors or a Regents Diploma with Advanced Designation with Honors.
A student who earns scores of 85 or higher on all of the required mathematics Regents Examinations is eligible for an annotation on their diploma that states that the student has mastery in mathematics.
A student who earns scores of 85 or higher on at least three science Regents Examinations is eligible for an annotation on their diploma that states that the student has mastery in science.

Scoring the Regents
The scores reported for regents exams are not a sum or percentage of questions answered correctly. Instead, raw scores on the tests are converted on a curve to the officially reported scale scores. This curve is customized to each year's group of tests. For example, for the Regents Examination in Algebra I given January 2019, a raw score on the test of 27 points (out of 86; so, 31% correct) would be given a scaled score of 65, that is, considered "proficient" for the purposes of being awarded the Regents Diploma.

Exemptions and other circumstances

Disabilities
Students with mild disabilities are generally placed in special education Regents prep courses, which will lead them to either a local or Regents diploma if indicated in their documents. Students with moderate to severe disabilities who are deemed unable to pass the Regents exams can earn a Career Development and Occupational Studies Commencement Credential, which will lead them to a local diploma.

Local Diploma requirements and information 
Local Diplomas are offered by New York State school districts for students who did not or cannot pass the Regents Diploma requirements. 

Students must score 65 or higher in:
Any one Regents examination

Students must score 55 or higher in:
Any one Regents examination

For students entering 9th grade in September 2019 and thereafter, the Local Diploma is only offered to disabled students. Students with an Individualized Education Program or 504 plan are able to obtain a local diploma through 'safety nets'. Similar to the regents diploma, the local diploma is recognized as a high school diploma, which would allow the student to attend college, enroll in the military, and have jobs that require a high school diploma. General Education students can only obtain the local diploma by appealing 2 regents exams. Students with disabilities must still have the appropriate number of credits to graduate.

Students who have an English as a Second Language are also able to obtain the local diploma simply by scoring 55 or higher in all 5 regents examinations required for high school graduation.

The safety nets include:

· Low Pass option: Which students must earn at least 55–64 on a required regents exam to qualify for a local diploma. Students who score 52–54 can appeal that score. This option is available to all students with disabilities or with an English as a Second Language program.

· Compensatory option: Students who score 45–54 on a required regents exam, but scores 65 or higher on another regents exam is able to compensate the 45–54 score using the 65+ score. The compensatory option may not be used to compensate the English Language Arts or math regents exams, but the student may use the English Language Arts and math regents to compensate another regents exam scored 45–54 as long as they scored 65 or higher. This option is available to all students with disabilities only.

Alternative public schools
During the 1990s, some alternative assessment schools were founded in parts of New York in an attempt to provide a way for students to graduate from high school without taking any Regents Exams. Usually, the substitute graduation assessment consisted of a review and grading, by a panel of teachers, of an academic portfolio – a collection of the student's best work from all his or her years at the school. From such a "portfolio examination" would be issued a "Regents equivalency" grade for the areas of Math, English, History, and Science, and a "Regents Equivalency" diploma would be awarded to the student at commencement. Students enrolled in these schools do, however, take the English Language Arts Regents exam as a part of the New York State school accountability system.

Private schools
Though all public schools are required to follow either the Regents Exam system or some form of alternative assessment, private schools need not. The vast majority of private schools do use Regents exams and award Regents diplomas, but some, usually academically prestigious private schools, do not. These schools' argument is that their own diploma requirements exceed Regents standards. Schools run by the Society of Jesus, such as Canisius High School, Fordham Prep, McQuaid Jesuit, Regis and Xavier, and by the Society of Mary (Marianists), such as Chaminade and Kellenberg, have not used Regents exams for decades. The Masters School, The Ursuline School, The Hackley School, The Harvey School, Long Island Lutheran Middle & High School, Manlius Pebble Hill School, and Nichols School also do not use the Regents system.

Allowable substitute examinations
Some Advanced Placement exams and SAT subject tests are allowable by NYSED as substitutes for the Regents Examination for that subject (e.g., AP United States History in place of the U.S. History and Government Regents).  NYSED has approved a small number of substitute exams and has published required scores for the exams.

Middle school Regents
Some middle schools in New York offer Honors programs that allow students to take the Algebra I, U.S. History & Government, Earth Science, and Living Environment Regents exams in June of eighth grade.

Notes

References

External links

General
 NYSED General Education and Diploma Requirements, November 2011
 NYSED Office of Assessment Policy, Development and Administration (APDA) High School General Information
 NYS Education Department Regents Exams
 NYS Board of Regents
 Part 100 of the Regulations of the Commissioner of Education

Test preparation
 NYS Regents Exams: New York State Library
New York Science Teacher: New York State (NYS) Regents Preparation
 The Physical Setting/Earth Science – #1 Earth Science Regents Review Website
 JMAP – Regents math examinations from 1866 to present.
 Regents Review Live!, produced by The New York Network, a Service of the State University of New York, in collaboration with the Teacher Resource and Computer Training Centers of New York State

Standardized tests in the United States
Education in New York (state)
New York State Education Department